Villa María de Río Seco Airport  was a rural airstrip  east of Villa de María del Río Seco, a town in the Córdoba Province of Argentina.

Google Earth Historical Imagery (8/9/2002) shows a  grass runway. The (9/16/2013) image and current Google Maps image show the runway returned to cropland.

See also

Transport in Argentina
List of airports in Argentina

References

External links 

Defunct airports
Airports in Argentina
Córdoba Province, Argentina